Elizabeth Anne Finn (1825–1921) was a British writer and the wife of James Finn, British Consul in Jerusalem, in Ottoman Palestine between 1846 and 1863. She and her daughter co-founded the Distressed Gentlefolk's Aid Association, the predecessor of Elizabeth Finn Care.

Early life
Elizabeth McCaul (later Finn) was born on 14 March 1825 to missionary parents in the Zamoyski Palace, Warsaw, Poland. Her father, the Reverend Alexander McCaul, was a noted scholar of Hebrew and worked for the London Society for Promoting Christianity Amongst the Jews. She describes in her Reminiscences as having 'devoted his life to what he considered to be the highest good for the Jewish people, and through them of the whole world.'

From an early age Elizabeth Finn combined a passion for knowledge with a love of housework. Without formal education, Elizabeth gained command of many foreign languages, becoming a polyglot from an early age. She was tutored in Hebrew by a convert from Judaism, Rav Avrohom. When deemed capable of reading for herself at the age of four, she received her own Bible in English. By her next birthday, she received a German Bible. By this time she was equally fluent in Yiddish. She first read and discovered Shakespeare in a German translation soon afterwards.

At the age of twelve, she would rise at 3:30 each morning to translate for publication Lavater's Maxims from the German original. She received two guineas for her labours, enough to purchase a dozen pairs of new stockings.  Queen Adelaide purchased a larger number of copies of this book for a bazaar, on the condition that Elizabeth herself would benefit.

The family lived in Palestine Place on the Cambridge Road in Bethnal Green, an area leased to the London Society for Promoting Christianity Amongst the Jews (a Christian missionary society now known as the Church's Ministry Among Jewish People). McCaul was appointed Warburton Lecturer of Lincoln's Inn in 1837. In 1843 the Bishop of London offered him the vicarage of St James Duke's Place, a parish with 800 Jewish inhabitants and only 100 Christians.  Elizabeth was an eyewitness to the Burning of Parliament in 1834 and the coronation procession of Queen Victoria in 1837.

Diplomatic life

After her marriage to James Finn, who was appointed British consul, the couple moved to Jerusalem. The consuls were instructed to befriend in every possible way the Jews in Jerusalem and Palestine, who had no kind of European protection.

As a diplomat's wife in Jerusalem, Elizabeth Finn learned Arabic by asking her Dragoman for ten Arabic words each day, putting one on the fingers of each hand.  In later life asked to translate the correspondence in Arabic dialect between the Mahdi Muhammed Ahmed and the late General Gordon 'of Khartoum.’

In November 1849 she helped to establish the Jerusalem Literary Society to explore the natural and ancient history of the region objectively and free from religious controversy. The Finns who had formed a library of a thousand volumes and a small museum, would take advantage of the Saturday, on which no Jewish business could be carried out, to ride out into the countryside in search of antiquities and there make valuable discoveries.

Many eminent travellers attended meetings of the Jerusalem Literary Society, news of which attracted the notice of Albert, Prince Consort, George Hamilton-Gordon, 4th Earl of Aberdeen and the Archbishop of Canterbury. During these years Finn became one of the first modern Europeans to be given permission to visit the Temple Mount and Dome of the Rock.

Elizabeth Finn contributed as a pioneer of photography helping bring the newly invented art to the region and, also supporting indigenous photographers such as Mendel John Diness.  When King Edward VII visited Jerusalem in April 1862, Finn took a photograph of him near a tree described as the "pine tree of Godfrey de Bouillon." It is included in a bound album of early photographs of the Holy Land taken by her, now preserved at Yad Ben Zvi in Jerusalem.

The landscape of Palestine and Jerusalem was of keen interest to Elizabeth Finn as is evinced by the meticulous depictions made in both word-paintings and pen and pencil sketches of various Biblical and historical landscapes.  Her work is marked with a painstaking level of attention as to how the landscape is charged and altered by the effects of light at different times of day.

William Holman Hunt who visited the region in 1854 halfway through the Finns' time in Jerusalem to research and sketch for The Scapegoat (painting) provided an introductory letter to Mrs Finn's eventual published collection of sketches validating her work as "very excellent topographical studies of the localities and in colour by no means overcharged for the original effects which the mountains, sky and plains of Syria glory in."

She was also able to entertain both Prince Alfred (second son of Queen Victoria) and latterly his elder brother the Prince of Wales (later Edward VII) in charming royal style, so forming the connections with Royal patronage that would later provide crucial early support for the Distressed Gentlefolk's Aid Association.

During her stay in Jerusalem, Finn organised training and employment of local men and women as carpenters, farm labourers and seamstresses. She raised money from abroad to battle malnutrition among the poor. She raised funds to purchase Kerem Avraham, a farm outside Jerusalem. She oversaw the excavation of extensive cisterns at Abraham's Vineyard to alleviate Jerusalem's inadequate water supply. In January 1854, she established the 'Sarah Society' which made home visits to poor women, providing relief in the form of rice, sugar and coffee.

Later life
The Finns made plans to return to England in 1863, eventually leaving on 14 July with Jewish bodies sending several petitions to the Queen not to remove their benefactor (James Finn) but to no avail. They spent the next three years visiting friends and relations, finally settling in Hammersmith. James Finn, suffering from poor health, died in 1872 aged 66. In 1875, Elizabeth Finn was asked by the Archbishop of Canterbury to act as translator for the Patriarch of the Ancient Syrian Church whilst he pursued a mission to England to support the claims of his parishioners on the coast of Malabar.  A two-week visit extended to an embassy lasting seven months that indulged the appetites of senior churchmen, politicians including William Ewart Gladstone, Lord Salisbury and Queen Victoria for religious enquiry and disputation.  Elizabeth Finn would repeat this task in 1908 and 1909 for the Bishop of Syria who had succeeded as Patriarch having himself accompanied the mission in 1875.

Finn continued to lecture on Biblical subjects in the Assyrian Room of the British Museum and retold her experiences in Jerusalem in support of the Survey for Exploration of Palestine at fundraising meetings to build on the legacy of the Jerusalem Literary Society.

In 1882 Elizabeth Finn, then 57, launched the Society for Relief of Distressed Jews to provide support for Russian Jews facing severe persecution during violent pogroms. Sir John Simon, a leading member of England's Jewish community was moved to testify to 'Mrs Finn's extraordinary knowledge of his people and astonishment that a Christian should take such an interest in his afflicted people'.

Distressed Gentlefolk's Aid Association

Finn founded the Distressed Gentlefolk's Aid Association based in her home in Brook Green, Hammersmith, to alleviate the suffering of those she saw in her own immediate environment. D.G.A.A. either bestowed grants for the immediate relief of the elderly and infirm or empowered individuals capable of working to get back onto their feet and find employment through targeted support and micro-loans.

Although ending her 'formal' participation with D.G.A.A. in 1901, Elizabeth Finn continued to closely monitor and assist the society for the rest of her life – attending her final committee meeting on 5 November 1920 two months before her death.

Children and death
Three surviving children were born during the Finns' diplomatic mission.  Their eldest child Alexander 'Guy Fawkes' Finn, who, like his father would pursue a diplomatic career, retiring as Consul General for Chile, was born on 5 November 1847.  In October 1851 Elizabeth's daughter Constance was born inside a tent pitched on a field north west of Jerusalem.  Elizabeth Finn gave birth to Constance having spent the entirety of the previous day personally entertaining the wife of the Turkish Pasha and her numerous escort of friends, servants and slaves.  A second son, Arthur Henry, was born in 1854 and in later life as a Hebrew scholar wrote "The Unity of the Pentateuch".

At the age of 72, Finn and her daughter Constance founded the Distressed Gentlefolk's Aid Association, the predecessor of Elizabeth Finn Care on 5 May 1897  'in the hope of alleviating some of the distress which has overtaken ladies and gentlemen who have seen better days.’

She died at home in Brook Green, Hammersmith, London on 18 January 1921 at the age of 95. She is buried next to her husband James in Wimbledon. Elizabeth Finn Care have their head office based just a few hundred yards from her home, which is marked with a blue plaque to commemorate her charitable work.

Published works
A Home in the Holy Land. A tale illustrating customs and incidents in modern Jerusalem London 1866 original.
A Home in the Holy Land. A tale illustrating customs and incidents in modern Jerusalem. Adamant Media, Boston, 2002 reprint of the London 1866 original. 
 A Third Year in Jerusalem. A tale illustrating customs and incidents of modern Jerusalem; or, a sequel to "Home in the Holy Land". Adamant Media, Boston, 2002 reprint of the London 1869 original. 
Reminiscences of Mrs Finn; Marshall, Morgan and Scott, 1929, London
Palestine Peasantry. Note on their clans, warfare, religion and laws Marshall Bros. 1923 95 pp. London, & Edinburgh
Original Maxims for the Young Translated by the Daughter of a Clergyman [i.e. Elizabeth Anne McCaul, afterwards Finn] 1838, London
 Sunrise over Jerusalem, with other pen and pencil sketches.  John B Day, 1873, London
Emmaus Identified – Printed for the Author – 75 Brook Green, London, W (first published in the Quarterly Journal January 1883 of the Palestine Exploration Fund)

See also
Saint George Interfaith shrine
Motza
Artas (village)

References

External links
 Translation by Elizabeth Anne Finn of The Autobiography of Thomas Platter at Gutenberg.org

 
 

1825 births
1921 deaths
British women writers
British Christians
British translators
Translators from German
Translators from Arabic
British women activists